Oluwakemi Nina Sosanya (born 6 June 1969) is an English stage, television, film, radio actress and narrator. She is most notable for her roles in Teachers, W1A and Last Tango in Halifax.

Early life and education
Sosanya was born in Islington, London, to a Nigerian father and an English mother. For a short time, she attended the Vale of Catmose College in Oakham and later trained at the Northern School of Contemporary Dance.

Career
Sosanya has appeared in many roles in the theatre, on television and in films. Her first big break in theatre was in Anthony and Cleopatra at the National Theatre, and with the 2001 series Teachers. She also appeared in Sorted, People Like Us, Love Actually, Nathan Barley, Renaissance, Casanova, as Karen Blaine in the Jonathan Creek episode "The Three Gamblers", Much Ado About Nothing, Cape Wrath/Meadowlands, the Doctor Who episode "Fear Her", and FM.

Sosanya appeared as Colly Trent in series 2 of the BBC television drama Five Days. She appeared in the BBC Four television series Twenty Twelve, a comedy about the London 2012 Olympic build up, and the BBC One drama series Silk and Hustle. She also made a brief appearance in the children's CBBC science fiction series, Wizards vs Aliens as Benny Sherwood's mother, Trisha.

Sosanya played the character Alibe Silver in Treasure Island (2012). She played a main character, Kate McKenzie, in series 1–3 of the BBC original drama Last Tango in Halifax during 2012–2015, and a main character, Lucy Freeman, in the TV series W1A in 2014. In 2015, she starred with Catherine Tate and Mark Gatiss in a new play, The Vote, in the run-up to the UK 2015 general election. In 2016, Sosanya appeared as DCI Laura Porter in the ITV series Marcella.

She appeared as Sister Mary Loquacious in the first series of Good Omens in 2018. It was announced in January 2022 that she would be reappearing in the second series.

In 2019, Sosanya narrated the CBeebies bedtime TV series, Moon and Me which is set in a toy house & follows the lives of toylike characters: Moon Baby, Pepi Nana, Sleepy Dibillo, Lambkin, Little Nana, Mr. Onion and Collywobble. There are 50 episodes.

In 2021, it was announced that she had been cast as lead warden Leigh in Channel 4 drama, Screw. It was broadcast in January 2022.

Theatre
In 2003, she played Rosalind in As You Like It with the Royal Shakespeare Company (RSC) at the Swan Theatre, Stratford-upon-Avon. In 2008, she returned to the RSC to play Rosaline in Love's Labour's Lost and, in 2009, appeared in a radio adaptation of a story from the short story collection The State of the Art. In January 2010, Sosanya appeared as Mae Pollock in Tennessee Williams' play Cat on a Hot Tin Roof at the Novello Theatre, London. In 2014, she appeared in the world premiere production of Privacy at the Donmar Warehouse, London. In 2016, she appeared in the world premiere production of Elegy at the Donmar Warehouse.

Audiobooks
Sosanya reads the part of Sephy on the audio book versions of Malorie Blackman's Noughts and Crosses series.

Filmography

Personal life
Sosanya keeps her private life private but mentioned a male partner on the Graham Norton show in 2020.

References

External links
 

1969 births
Living people
20th-century English actresses
21st-century English actresses
Actresses from London
Black British actresses
English film actresses
English people of Nigerian descent
English people of Yoruba descent
English Shakespearean actresses
English stage actresses
English television actresses
English voice actresses
People from Islington (district)
Royal Shakespeare Company members
Yoruba actresses